Isaac Briot (1585 – 1670) a French engraver and draughtsman, was born in 1585, and died in Paris in 1670. His plates are rather neatly executed, in the style of Wierix, and mostly from his own compositions.

Portraits
Cardinal de Richelieu.
Cardinal d'Amboise, archbishop of Rouen. (pictured)
Gaspard, Comte de Coligny.
The poet François Malherbe, in 4to.
The poet Marini, in 4to.

Other subjects
The Alliance of France with Spain.
St. John the Baptist in the Desert.
St. Peter weeping.
L'Oraison dominicale expliquee par des emblèmes. Two small plates.
The Virtues. Seven small plates.
The Sibyls. A set of small circular plates.
Ovid's 'Metamorphoses.'  A set of plates published 1637.

Marie Briot, daughter of Isaac, with her father, executed plates after Paul de La Barre, J. B. Coriolan, St. Igny, and others.

References
 

Engravers from Paris
17th-century French engravers
1585 births
1670 deaths
French draughtsmen